William Mervine (14 March 1791 – 15 September 1868) was a rear admiral in the United States Navy, whose career included service in the War of 1812, the Mexican–American War and the American Civil War.

Born in Philadelphia, Pennsylvania, Mervine was appointed midshipman in January 1809. Serving on Lake Ontario during the War of 1812, he later cruised off Africa and South America, in the West Indies and in the Pacific.

While in command of the  during the war with Mexico, 1846 and 1847, he led a detachment of sailors and United States Marines against Monterey, California, and on 7 July 1846, took possession and hoisted the American flag over the city. On 7–9 October 1846, Mervine led 203 U.S. Marines, 147 American sailors, and volunteers in the invasion of Los Angeles where he lost the Battle of Dominguez Rancho. Fourteen Marines were killed. José Antonio Carrillo, a Californio rancher, led 50 Spanish Californio lancers in that defeat of Mervine and the American forces.

Serving also during the Civil War, he commanded the Gulf Blockading Squadron from 6 May 1861, until obliged by ill health to give up the command on 22 September 1861. He died at Utica, New York.

The Navy has named two destroyers  in his honor.

References

 

1791 births
1868 deaths
United States Navy admirals
People from Pennsylvania in the War of 1812
United States Navy personnel of the Mexican–American War
Union Navy admirals
Military personnel from Philadelphia
People of Pennsylvania in the American Civil War